Phil, Philip or Phillip Ward may refer to:

Phillip Ward (1924–2003), Welsh Guards officer in the British Army
Philip Henry Ward Jr. (1886–1963), American stamp dealer 
Philip Ward (judge), Chief Justice of Jamaica in 1661
Phil Ward, Australian creator of Phil Ward Racing
Phil Ward, member of the Editorial Advisory Council of Inside GNSS